Nadia Kounda (born 24 October 1989) is a Moroccan film actress.

Career 
Nadia Kounda was born in Casablanca, Morocco. She began her career in film and television in 2008, in Morocco. In 2011, she played the leading role in the film , achieving recognition in her native country. That same year she moved to Montréal, Canada, where she studied acting and film production. Kounda has been featured in national and international film and television productions.

Filmography 

 L'amante du rif as Aya.

 Rabat in a supporting role. (Nasrdin Dchar won a Gouden Kalf best actor award for his performance in this film.)

 Mistaken as Layla Atta-Bassir.

References

External links 
 

Living people
1989 births
21st-century Moroccan actresses
Moroccan film actresses
Moroccan television actresses
People from Casablanca
Moroccan expatriates in Canada